Volver a Nacer is the seventh studio album and eighth overall recorded by Puerto Rican performer Chayanne. It was released by Sony Music Latin and Columbia Records on September 17, 1996 (see 1996 in music). The album was produced by Marcello Azevedo, Estéfano, Donato Póveda, Hal S. Batt, Manny Benito, Ronnie Foster and Steve Roitsein. The album was a hit amongst the Latin Americans, which led to success to the Top Latin Albums Chart, peaking at number 33.

Track listing

Music videos
 Sólamente Tu Amor
 Baila, Baila [Meme's Boriqua Mix]
 Volver a Nacer
 Guajira

Charts

Sales and certifications

References

1996 albums
Chayanne albums
Spanish-language albums
Sony Discos albums
Columbia Records albums
Albums produced by Estéfano